Foley is a city in Baldwin County, Alabama, United States. The 2010 census lists the population of the city as 14,618. Foley is a principal city of the Daphne-Fairhope-Foley metropolitan area, which includes all of Baldwin County.

History
Foley was named for its founder, John B. Foley of Chicago. As Foley was traveling to President William McKinley's funeral in 1901, he met a railroad agent who told him of the area in South Baldwin County. He then returned to Chicago and formed the Magnolia Springs Land Company, currently known as the Magnolia Land Company. As he began to sell off acreage, he realized the need for a better way for the people to come to Foley.

Foley used some of his own money to lay the rails so the train could come from Bay Minette. The first railroad station was built in 1905. The original station burned in 1908 and was replaced the following year by the station that is now the city's museum. John Foley donated parcels of land for a school, railroad station, park and churches. These included the current Catholic Church, Saint Margaret of Scotland, the Baptist church and the Methodist church.  He also invested in a hotel, a demonstration farm, a bank and the utility company.

The first train to service Foley was a wood burner called the "Pine Knot Special." It would leave Foley in the morning and make a return trip in the afternoon. As people cleared the land, they would place lighter knots in a wood box for the engineer to use as was needed. Foley was incorporated in 1915 with G. I. Weatherly serving as its first mayor.

Geography
Foley is located at 30°24'20.138" North, 87°40'53.432" West (30.405594, -87.681509).

Demographics

2020 census

As of the 2020 United States census, there were 20,335 people, 8,090 households, and 4,298 families residing in the city.

2010 census
As of the census of 2010, there were 14,618 people, 6,165 households, and 4,124 families residing in the city. The racial makeup of the city was 77.1% White, 14.9% Black or African American, 0.6% Native American, 1.1% Asian, 0.1% Pacific Islander, 4.7% from other races, and 1.6% from two or more races. 9.5% of the population were Hispanic or Latino of any race.

There were 6,165 households, out of which 23.7% had children under the age of 18 living with them, 48.5% were married couples living together, 14.2% had a female householder with no husband present, and 33.1% were non-families. 27.4% of all households were made up of individuals, and 12.2% had someone living alone who was 65 years of age or older. The average household size was 2.35 and the average family size was 2.82.

In the city, the age distribution of the population shows 20.9% under the age of 18, 8.7% from 18 to 24, 22.9% from 25 to 44, 20.9% from 45 to 64, and 22.0% who were 65 years of age or older. The median age was 42.5 years. For every 100 females, there were 88.3 males. For every 100 females age 18 and over, there were 87.8 males.

The median income for a household in the city was $41,221, and the median income for a family was $50,854. Males had a median income of $36,959 versus $26,855 for females. The per capita income for the city was $22,967. About 15.4% of families and 19.2% of the population were below the poverty line, including 35.9% of those under age 18 and 5.7% of those age 65 or over.

Education
Foley is a part of the Baldwin County Public Schools system. An elementary school, an intermediate school, a middle school, and a high school serve the city of Foley.

Schools

Post-secondary school
 Fortis College

High school
 Foley High School (9-12)

Middle school
 Foley Middle School (7-8)

Primary schools
 Foley Intermediate School (5-6)
 Foley Elementary School (K-4)
Magnolia Elementary Schools (K-6)

Foley Public Library
The Foley Public Library has in excess of 50,000 volumes, internet computers, children's reading programs and public meeting rooms for civic organizations.

Points of interest
The City of Foley Antique Rose Trail features over five hundred varieties of fragrant roses.

OWA is a 520-acre resort destination located in Foley, AL, near the commercial corridor of S McKenzie street. Owned and operated by the Poarch Band of Creek Indians, OWA's name is inspired from the Muscogee Creek term meaning “big water.” It opened in 2017, being centered around an artificial lake with an island(Dubbed Gravity Island), similarly to another Entertainment District, Broadway at the Beach in Myrtle Beach, SC. The resort features a Entertainment, Shopping, and Dining section called Downtown OWA, a amusement park section called The Park at OWA, with rides being supplied by Italian manufacturer Zamperla, including a rollercoaster called Rollin' Thunder, a copy of Thunderbolt at Zamperla's Luna Park, and a Marriott TownPlace Suites Hotel. A water park expansion is coming soon in 2022, featuring an indoor half and outdoor half. OWA also held the Gulf Coast Hot Air Balloon Festival for 2021.

The Commercial corridor features a variety of shops, including a Tanger Outlet.

Notable people

Justin Anderson, professional football linebacker
Fannie Flagg, actress, comedienne, and author of Fried Green Tomatoes and other novels, lived in Fairhope for a time
D. J. Fluker, former offensive lineman for the Alabama Crimson Tide and current NFL Free Agent 
Julio Jones, former wide receiver for the Alabama Crimson Tide and current wide receiver for the Tampa Bay Buccaneers
Everett A. Kelly, member of the Florida House of Representatives from 1978 to 1982
Robert Lester, professional football defensive back
Bubba Marriott, football player
Ken Stabler, former quarterback for the Oakland Raiders, Houston Oilers and New Orleans Saints in the NFL, and the Alabama Crimson Tide in collegiate football
Chris Watton, former professional football offensive lineman

Activities
The City of Foley Museum & Archives and Model Train Exhibit is located in a restored train depot from the early 1900s. It holds archives for the City of Foley as well as railroad memorabilia.

Holmes Medical Museum is located in downtown Foley and was the first hospital in Baldwin County. It has a doctor's sled on display as well as a large collection of 20th century medical equipment.

References

External links

Cities in Alabama
Cities in Baldwin County, Alabama